The Ghost of Tom Joad Tour was a worldwide concert tour featuring Bruce Springsteen performing alone on stage in small halls and theatres, that ran off and on from late 1995 through the middle of 1997.  It followed the release of his 1995 album The Ghost of Tom Joad.

The tour represented Springsteen's first full-length, solo tour; he traveled with only an instrument technician and a sound engineer.   As such it was a marked departure from the high-energy shows with the E Street Band that Springsteen had become famous for.  The album itself was quiet, dark and angry, and Springsteen presented it as such in the shows on the tour.  Older songs from Springsteen's catalog, such as "Born in the U.S.A.", were presented in very different, often harsh re-arrangements.

The result, especially in the tour's first leg of shows, was an uncompromising portrayal of pessimism; Jon Pareles of The New York Times said that with the tour's performances, Springsteen "has taken his music to an extreme, a depressive's view of tedious, unending woe."  Greg Kot of the Chicago Tribune wrote that "In contrast to past tours, which have been celebratory events tinged by introspection, Springsteen brought a sobering sense of solitude" to the shows of this tour.  By some of the later shows of the tour, however, Springsteen relaxed the mood a bit by interweaving a few new songs with an almost comedic bent.

Itinerary

The tour began on November 21, 1995, at the State Theatre in New Brunswick, New Jersey. The first group of shows ran through the end of the year in major media centers such as Los Angeles, the San Francisco area, Washington, D.C., Philadelphia, New York City, and Boston.

After a winter holiday break, the show visited other North American cities in January 1996, including a stop in Youngstown, Ohio, due to "Youngstown" being the album track most (relatively) played on radio.

February and March saw shows in Western Europe, followed by a three-week break during which Springsteen attended the Academy Awards show in Los Angeles. The tour resumed in Europe through early May.

A family man with three small children at the time, Springsteen took off the summer of 1996 and then started again in the U.S. in mid-September, playing smaller markets and colleges, as well as local stops in Asbury Park and his old St. Rose of Lima School in Freehold, and finishing in mid-December.

Another winter holiday break was taken, then in late January 1997 Springsteen took the show to Japan and Australia for three weeks. In May the final leg started up; first Springsteen went to Stockholm to accept the Polar Music Prize, then he toured Central Europe, seeing Austria, Poland, and the Czech Republic, before concluding with additional shows back in Western Europe. The 128th and final show of the tour was on May 26, 1997, at the Palais des Congrès in Paris and was attended by hundreds of fans from around the world.

Show
While the Ghost of Tom Joad album was in the more acoustic, somber vein of his earlier Nebraska, it did contain some limited additional instrumentation and arrangements. However, Springsteen decided to perform the new material completely by himself, using only acoustic guitar and harmonica. (A couple of the dourest Joad numbers did have a hidden offstage synthesizer being played by Springsteen's guitar technician Kevin Buell.)

Given that Springsteen was famous for his full-band, high-energy, crowd-rousing concerts, this tour was sure to be a surprising departure. Advertisements tried to make this clear, and all show tickets were printed with Solo Acoustic Tour on them to give audiences a firm understanding of what to expect (and leading some to call the tour by that name, although it would become ambiguous in light of the later Devils & Dust Tour; Springsteen's publicists did not give this tour any formal name).

After an opening rendition of "The Ghost of Tom Joad", which featured audience members whooping and "Brooocing" by habit, Springsteen regularly addressed this audience with some variation of this speech:

"This is where I get to set the ground rules a little bit ... a lot of these songs tonight were composed using a lot of silence, silence is a part of the music, so I really need your collaboration tonight in giving me that silence so I can do my best for you ... if you feel like clapping or singing along, you'll be an embarrassment to your friends and family ... if someone sitting next to you is talking, politely ask them to shut the fuck up ... Don't make me come down there and smack you around, it'll mess with my man-of-the-people image."

Sometimes Springsteen felt the need to reiterate parts of the message after subsequent songs, especially if Brooocing continued.  The whole bit created quite an impression among Springsteen fans, some of whom would always refer to this as the Shut the Fuck Up Tour as a result, and others of whom would wish the same rules were in effect for slower songs at future Springsteen E Street Band concerts.

The performance style of the tour varied greatly depending upon song.  Some older numbers such as "Darkness on the Edge of Town" and the recently exhumed "Murder Incorporated" were vigorously strummed on guitar and bellowed in voice.  Slide work also sometimes lent musical dynamism. But most selections, including almost all of the Joad material, were indeed arranged with silence as the leading accompaniment.  Even normal fan favorite "Born in the U.S.A." was recast into a snarling attack mostly bereft of its anthemic title line. "The Promised Land" was transformed into a ghostly echo of its usually rousing self, propelled by percussive slapping of Springsteen's Takamine guitar body.

The typical all-Joad six-song closing sequence of the main set – "Youngstown", "Sinaloa Cowboys", "The Line", "Balboa Park", "The New Timer", and "Across the Border" – was especially stark and quiet.  Based on the fates of lost American workers and Mexican immigrants in California, it suffered from some of same lack of melodic interest and forced didactic purpose that the album had been criticized for.

As the tour wore on, shows became a little looser.  Springsteen introduced some humorous songs he had recently written, including "In Freehold", a ribald homage to his growing up, "In Michigan", a homage about the folks in Michigan, "Sell It and They Will Come", a tribute to the insanity of late-night infomercials, and "Pilgrim in the Temple of Love", a tale of Santa Claus doing something naughty.  Indeed, explicit sexual mentions became something of a theme of the tour, with Springsteen telling any children in the audience that words they didn't understand were Latin for "doing your homework", or "cleaning your room".  Springsteen also engaged the faithful by unearthing some old numbers that had not seen concert action in a long time, or in the case of Greetings from Asbury Park, N.J.'''s "The Angel", ever; Springsteen once swore he would never perform the song live (it wasn't performed again until 2009 during a full performance of the album). The tour also marked the first time that Springsteen did not perform anything from Born to Run. Nothing from the album was soundchecked, although on the third to final date of the tour, Springsteen treated fans in Italy to a post-show singalong performance of "Thunder Road" from the venue's balcony. Two songs written for the Joad album that did not make the final cut, "The Hitter" and "Long Time Comin'", made their tour debuts, although Springsteen would not release the two songs for another ten years until the 2005 Devils & Dust album.

Critical and commercial reaction

Due to the small venues played on the tour, often in the 2,000–3,000 capacity range, tickets were often hard to get, creating a "ticket scalpers' heaven". Dave Marsh's Two Hearts biography assessed the tour as not expanding Springsteen's audience any, but helping to solidify it, especially in Europe.

The Asbury Park Press characterized a November 1995 Count Basie Theatre show as Springsteen "spinning his acoustic tales of desperation and hope ... he played with power and poise ... The lyrics are bleaker than usual for Springsteen and the music reflects the solemn mood."  The New York Times said a December 1995 Beacon Theatre show "easily qualifies as the most earnest concert of the year", that "Where [Springsteen] once saw open highways, he now sees roads to nowhere", and that "Springsteen turned in a painstaking and convincing performance. But with that material, he has turned himself into nearly a one-note performer." The Washington Post, on the other hand, found a December 1995 DAR Constitution Hall performance showing strains of the "sense of triumph" that Springsteen's previous work had evoked, although his physical appearance made him "look more like the custodian at Constitution Hall than the star attraction."

The collection Hard Travelin': The Life and Legacy of Woody Guthrie, edited by Robert Santelli and Emily Davidson, found praise for the tour, saying the album's songs gained onstage and that the shows, "although hushed and void of the anthemic rockers that made him the greatest performer that rock has ever known, managed to bring Woody Guthrie back to life again."  Jimmy Gutterman's Runaway American Dream: Listening to Bruce Springsteen criticized the first leg of the tour for producing "the most dour performances of his career". However Guterman praised later legs that incorporated new material that was "sly, low-key, and funny."

Broadcasts and recordings
Portions of the December 8 and December 9, 1995, shows from Philadelphia's Tower Theater were later broadcast on the syndicated Columbia Records Radio Hour on U.S. album-oriented rock stations.

Several shows were released as part of the Bruce Springsteen Archives:
 Kings Hall, Belfast March 19, 1996, released September 1, 2017
 Freehold, NJ 1996 Saint Rose of Lima School Gym, released May 4, 2018
 Asbury Park 11/24/96, released November 1, 2019
 Nice France 1997, released February 5, 2021
 ‘’Philadelphia 12/9/95’’ released February 4, 2022
 Asbury Park 11/26/96, released November 4, 2022

Tour dates

Songs performed

Source:

Sources
 Guterman, Jimmy.  Runaway American Dream: Listening to Bruce Springsteen.  Cambridge: DeCapo Press, 2005.
 Marsh, Dave.  Bruce Springsteen on Tour: 1968–2005.  Bloomsbury USA, 2006.  .
 Santelli, Robert, "Beyond Folk: Woody Guthrie's Impact on Rock and Roll", in Robert Santelli and Emily Davidson, eds.  Hard Travelin': The Life and Legacy of Woody Guthrie.  Hanover: Wesleyan University Press, 1999.  
 Santelli, Robert.  Greetings From E Street: The Story of Bruce Springsteen and the E Street Band''.  San Francisco: Chronicle Books, 2006.  
 Killing Floor's concert database supplies the itinerary and set lists for the shows, but does not support direct linking to individual dates.
 Brucebase the same, with ticket and promotional images as well.

References 

Bruce Springsteen concert tours
1995 concert tours
1996 concert tours
1997 concert tours